The Sheriff of the Lothians and Peebles was historically the office responsible for enforcing law and order and bringing criminals to justice in The Lothians and Peebles, Scotland.  Prior to 1748 most sheriffdoms were held on a hereditary basis. From that date, following the Jacobite uprising of 1745, the hereditary sheriffs were replaced by salaried sheriff-deputes, qualified advocates who were members of the Scottish Bar.

The position of Sheriff of the Lothians had been created in 1881 following a merger of the sheriffdom of Midlothian and Haddington with the Linlithgow part of the sheriffdom of Linlithgow, Clackmannan & Kinross. The position of Sheriff of Peebles was then joined to it in 1883 to create the new position of Sheriff of the Lothians & Peebles.

This latter sheriffdom was replaced in 1975 by the current sheriffdom of Lothian and Borders.

Sheriffs of the Lothians (1881)

Sheriffs of Peebles

Gilbert Fraser, 1259
Aymer de Maxwell, 1262
Simon Fraser of Oliver, 1266-1291
William of Durham, 1302
Aymer de Valence, 2nd Earl of Pembroke, 1306
Adam Lockhart, 1357
Lawrence of Govan, 1359
Thomas Hay, 1373
Walter Tweedy, 1373 - Deputy 
William Hay, 1388
Adam Dickson, 1388 - Deputy
John Hay, 1st Lord Hay of Yester, 1464–1509
David Hay, 1470
Thomas Hay, 1470 - Deputy
William Douglas, 2nd Earl of March, 1724–1747 
James Veitch of Elliock, 1747– 
Sheriffs-Depute
James Montgomery, 1748–?1760
Alexander Murray of Murrayfield, 1761–1775 
James Wolf Murray, 1789–1811 
James Wedderburn, 1811–1816 
Andrew Clephane, 1816–>1825
John Wood, c.1835–1840 
George Napier, 1840-1883

Sheriffs of the Lothians and Peebles (1883)
 James Arthur Crichton, 1885–1891
 Alexander Blair, 1891–1896 
 Andrew Rutherford, 1896–1904 
 Charles Cornelius Maconochie, 1904–>1918 
 Gerard Lake Crole, KC, –1927 
 Charles Herbert Brown, KC, 1927–c.1937
 John Charles Fenton, 1942–1951 
 James Albert Gilchrist, QC, 1953– 
 William Ross McLean, QC, 1960–  
 Gerald Paisley Sinclair Shaw, 1965– 
 William James Bryden, 1973–1975  (Sheriff Principal of Lothian and Borders, 1975)
 After 1975 the sheriffdom was merged into the new sheriffdom of Lothian and Borders.

See also
 Historical development of Scottish sheriffdoms

References

Lothian
Peebles
East Lothian
History of Edinburgh